AXA Arena can refer to the sponsorship name of the following:
 
Letná Stadium
Winterthur Central Sports Hall
NTC Aréna